Prairieville Township may refer to:

 Prairieville Township, Michigan
 Prairieville Township, Brown County, Minnesota
 Prairieville Township, Pike County, Missouri

Township name disambiguation pages